Gilbert Alison is an Australian politician. He served as a Liberal Party member of the Legislative Assembly of Queensland for the seat of Maryborough from 1971 until his defeat in 1977, before returning at the 1983 election as a member of the National Party. He served as Minister for Main Roads and Racing in the short-lived government of Russell Cooper between 25 September and 7 December 1989, before again being defeated and retiring from politics.

References

Liberal Party of Australia members of the Parliament of Queensland
Living people
National Party of Australia members of the Parliament of Queensland
Members of the Queensland Legislative Assembly
1933 births